This is a list of public holidays in Iraq.

Other important dates
These are working days at the KRG Council of Ministers, and businesses are open. Special events take place around the Iraqi Kurdistan Region to mark these dates.

10 February: Kurdish Authors Union Day
18 February: Kurdish Students Union Day
1 March: Commemoration of Mustafa Barzani’s Death
7 March: Liberation of Slemani City
8 March: Women's Day
10 March: Kurdish Clothes Day (Iraqi Kurdistan only)
13 March: Liberation of Duhok City
16 March: Halabja Day
20 March: Liberation of Kirkuk City
1 April: Assyrian New Year
14 April: Commemoration of Anfal genocide against the Kurds
16 April: Remembrance of Chemical Attack on Balisan and Sheikh Wasan
25 April: Anniversary of First Cabinet of Kurdish Government (1993)
13 June: Suleimaniah City Fallen and Martyrs Day
11 December: Establishment of Kurdish Women’s Union

References

 
Iraq
Iraqi culture
Holidays